The 1999 NHL Expansion Draft was an expansion draft held by the National Hockey League (NHL) to fill the roster of the league's expansion team for the 1999–2000 season, the Atlanta Thrashers. The draft took place on June 25, 1999 in Boston, Massachusetts.

Rules
The Thrashers were to select 26 players, one from each existing franchise (except for the Nashville Predators) at the time of the draft. Each franchise was allowed to protect either one goaltender, five defensemen, and nine forwards or two goaltenders, three defensemen, and seven forwards. Teams which lost goaltenders in the 1998 NHL Expansion Draft (Anaheim, Los Angeles, Montreal, New Jersey and the New York Rangers) could not lose a goaltender in the 1999 Draft.

The Thrashers were to choose at least three goaltenders, eight defensemen, and thirteen forwards. Their final two choices could be from any position.

Protected players

Eastern Conference

Western Conference

Draft results
These results are numbered 1–26 for aesthetic purposes, but the players were not necessarily chosen in this order. As the Thrashers were the only team participating in the draft, the order is inconsequential.

Deals
In return for agreeing not to select certain unprotected players, the Thrashers were granted concessions by other franchises. The trades were officially booked as being for "future considerations":

Ottawa traded Damian Rhodes to Atlanta on June 18, 1999
Buffalo traded Dean Sylvester to Atlanta on June 25, 1999
Calgary traded Andreas Karlsson to Atlanta on June 25, 1999
Detroit traded Ulf Samuelsson to Atlanta on June 25, 1999
New Jersey traded Sergei Vyshedkevich to Atlanta on June 25, 1999
Phoenix traded Scott Langkow to Atlanta on June 25, 1999

Post-draft
Several of the players selected by the Thrashers in the Expansion Draft did not stay with the team long after the draft. In fact, the Thrashers traded two players later in the same day:

Trevor Kidd (traded to Florida for Gord Murphy, Daniel Tjarnqvist, Herberts Vasiljevs, and a sixth-round pick (Justin Cox) in the 1999 NHL Entry Draft)
Peter Ferraro (traded to Boston for Randy Robitaille)

Other players who were no longer on the Thrashers' roster at the start of the 1999–2000 season include the following:

Phil Crowe (traded to Nashville for future considerations on June 26, 1999)
Jamie Pushor (traded to Dallas for Jason Botterill and cash and 7th round draft pick on July 15, 1999)
Terry Yake (claimed off waivers by St. Louis on September 30, 1999)
Alexei Yegorov (released before the season began)
Mark Tinordi (retired before the season began)

See also
1999 NHL Entry Draft
1999–2000 NHL season

References

External links
 1999 NHL Expansion Draft player stats at The Internet Hockey Database
 Here are your Atlanta Thrashers (hockeynut.com)
 Usenet post entitled "All-Time Thrashers - How They Came And Left"

Expansion Draft
Atlanta Thrashers
National Hockey League expansion drafts